ISO 843 is a system for the transliteration and/or transcription of Greek characters into Latin characters.

It was released by the International Organization for Standardization in 1997. The transcription table is based on the first edition (1982) of the ELOT 743 transcription and transliteration system created by ELOT and officially adopted by the Greek government. The transliteration table provided major changes to the original one by ELOT, which in turn aligned to ISO 843 for the second edition of its ELOT 743 (2001).

1997 edition

Transliteration (Type 1) 

Exceptions:
double vowels  are transliterated as au. The transliteration could also be "av" or "af", according to https://web.archive.org/web/20110809113951/http://www.passport.gov.gr/elot-743.html 
double vowels  are transliterated as eu
double vowels  are transliterated as ou

Transcription (Type 2) 
ISO 843 also includes a system for transcription, referred to as "Type 2" in the protocol.

See also 
 List of ISO standards
List of ISO transliterations
Romanization of Greek

Notes and references

External links 
Transliteration of Non-Roman Scripts -A collection of writing systems and transliteration tables, by Thomas T. Pedersen.  PDF reference charts include ISO 843.
 Lingua::Translit Perl module covering a variety of writing systems. Transliteration according to several standards including ISO 843 and DIN 31634 for Greek.

Greek alphabet
Romanization of Greek
00843
00843